Alfredo Saul Abrantes Abreu (19 April 1929 – 16 April 2005) was a Portuguese footballer who played as a midfielder, notably for S.L. Benfica.

External links 
 
 

1929 births
2005 deaths
Footballers from Lisbon
Portuguese men's footballers
Association football midfielders
Primeira Liga players
S.L. Benfica footballers
C.F. Os Belenenses players
Portugal international footballers